In computational number theory and computational algebra, Pollard's kangaroo algorithm (also Pollard's lambda algorithm, see Naming below) is an algorithm for solving the discrete logarithm problem.  The algorithm was introduced in 1978 by the number theorist J. M. Pollard, in the same paper as his better-known Pollard's rho algorithm for solving the same problem.  Although Pollard described the application of his algorithm to the discrete logarithm problem in the multiplicative group of units modulo a prime p, it is in fact a generic discrete logarithm algorithm—it will work in any finite cyclic group.

Algorithm
Suppose  is a finite cyclic group of order  which is generated by the element , and we seek to find the discrete logarithm  of the element  to the base . In other words, one seeks  such that .

1. Choose a set  of integers and define a pseudorandom map .

2. Choose an integer  and compute a sequence of group elements  according to:
 
 
3. Compute

Observe that:

4. Begin computing a second sequence of group elements  according to:
 
 
and a corresponding sequence of integers  according to:
.
Observe that:

5.

If the sequences  and  "collide" in this manner, then we have:

and so we are done.

B) . If this occurs, then the algorithm has failed to find .

Complexity
For this reason, Pollard's lambda algorithm is considered an exponential time algorithm. For an example of a subexponential time discrete logarithm algorithm, see the index calculus algorithm.

Naming
The algorithm is well known by two names.

The first is "Pollard's kangaroo algorithm".  This name is a reference to an analogy used in the paper presenting the algorithm, where the algorithm is explained in terms of using a tame kangaroo to trap a wild kangaroo.  Pollard has explained that this analogy was inspired by a "fascinating" article published in the same issue of Scientific American as an exposition of the RSA public key cryptosystem.  The article described an experiment in which a kangaroo's "energetic cost of locomotion, measured in terms of oxygen consumption at various speeds, was determined by placing kangaroos on a treadmill".

The second is "Pollard's lambda algorithm".  Much like the name of another of Pollard's discrete logarithm algorithms, Pollard's rho algorithm, this name refers to the similarity between a visualisation of the algorithm and the Greek letter lambda.  The shorter stroke of the letter lambda corresponds to the sequence , since it starts from the position b to the right of x.  Accordingly, the longer stroke corresponds to the sequence , which "collides with" the first sequence (just like the strokes of a lambda intersect) and then follows it subsequently.

Pollard has expressed a preference for the name "kangaroo algorithm", as this avoids confusion with some parallel versions of his rho algorithm, which have also been called "lambda algorithms".

See also
 Rainbow table

References

Number theoretic algorithms
Computer algebra
Logarithms